Tower Transit Singapore is a contracted bus operator operating in Singapore. It commenced operations on 29 May 2016 and it is a subsidiary of Transit Systems.

History
In October 2014, the Land Transport Authority called for tenders to operate 26 routes out of Bulim Bus Depot in Jurong West based from Bukit Batok, Clementi and Jurong East bus interchanges as part of its new Bus Contracting Model.

In May 2015, the Land Transport Authority awarded Tower Transit Singapore the contract with operations to commence in May 2016, with services based at the Bulim Bus Depot. On 31 July 2015, the Land Transport Authority handed over Bulim Bus Depot to Tower Transit Singapore, allowing preparations such as fitting works on the depot and training of its staff to be carried out earlier.

On 6 December 2015, the Bulim Bus Depot was officially opened by MP for Hong Kah North, Amy Khor and the then-CEO of Tower Transit, Adam Leishman. A Bulim Carnival Day was also held on the same day to allow the public to tour the depot and also learn more about Tower Transit.

Tower Transit Singapore commenced operations on 29 May 2016.

On 10 December 2016, Tower Transit Singapore became the first bus operator in Singapore to award an employee with a leisure trip. Mr Kumaran joined Tower Transit Singapore in May after 16 years with SMRT Buses, and received a pair of return tickets to London and five nights’ accommodation worth S$4,500 for excellent service.

On 13 February 2017, Tower Transit Singapore became the first bus operator in Singapore to celebrate Valentine's Day. Tower Transit buses all had Happy Valentines Day programmed onto their buses' Electronic Destination Signages (EDS) and ran an article in The New Paper regarding the couples working in Tower Transit.

On 1 March 2017, Tower Transit Singapore rolled out its signature scent on 100 buses operating on routes 66, 97 and 106. Tower Transit is the first bus operator in Singapore to have such an initiative.

On 8 March 2017, Tower Transit Singapore became the first bus operator to celebrate International Women's Day.

On 13 March 2017, Tower Transit Singapore started operating Singapore's first 3-door double-decker bus for a six-month trial period.

On 30 September 2020, the Land Transport Authority awarded the Sembawang-Yishun Bus Package to Tower Transit Singapore, along with the second 5-year term of the Bulim Bus Package. 

Operations for the Bulim and Sembawang-Yishun packages commenced in May and September 2021 respectively, with Mandai Bus Depot handed over to Tower Transit Singapore for the Sembawang-Yishun Bus Package.

Bus routes

Tower Transit Singapore currently operates 55 bus services under the Bulim and Sembawang-Yishun Bus Packages, consisting of 30 Bulim bus services and 25 Sembawang-Yishun bus services. They are operated mainly from Bukit Batok, Jurong East, Yishun bus interchange, Sembawang Bus Interchange and with a handful of routes operating from Clementi Bus Interchange and Woodlands Integrated Transport Hub, under Bulim Bus Depot and Mandai Bus Depot. 

Tower Transit is operating the Bulim bus package for another term on 29 May 2021 as continuous to commemorate its 5th anniversary of operations in Singapore, with bus services 653, 657 and 944 handed over to Tower Transit from SMRT Buses. In doing so, it gave up operations of services 665 and 974 to SMRT Buses and SBS Transit respectively.

Between September and October 2021, bus services were handed over from SMRT Buses in three tranches as part of the Sembawang-Yishun Package. City Direct service 663, which was under the bus package, was already operated by Tower Transit. The bus package was based at Mandai Bus Depot:
 5 September 2021: 171, 670, 853, 853M, 854, 854e, 855, 856, 857
 19 September 2021: 169, 858, 963, 963e, 965, 966, 969
 3 October 2021: 167, 656, 825, 859, 882, 883, 883M, 980, 981
 23 January 2022: 801

Bus fleet

Double-decker buses
Alexander Dennis Enviro500 MMC
Alexander Dennis Enviro500 (3-Door)
MAN ND323F Lion's City (A95) (Gemilang Coachworks)
MAN ND323F Lion's City (A95) (Gemilang Coachworks) (3-Door)
Volvo B9TL (Wright Eclipse Gemini 2)
Yutong E12DD

Single-decker buses

BYD C6 (Gemilang Coachworks)
MAN NL323F Lion's City (A22) (Gemilang Coachworks)
Mercedes-Benz O530 Citaro (EvoBus)
Mercedes-Benz OC500LE (Gemilang Coachworks)
Volvo B5LH (MCV eVoRa)
Yutong E12

Articulated buses
MAN NG363F Lion's City (A24) (Gemilang Coachworks)

References

External links

Singaporean companies established in 2016
Bus companies of Singapore
Transport companies established in 2016
Transport operators of Singapore
2016 establishments in Singapore
Singaporean brands